Marco Curto (born 5 January 1999) is an Italian professional footballer who plays as a centre back for  club Südtirol.

Club career
Born in Naples, Curto started his career in AC Milan youth sector, before joined to Empoli on 3 July 2017.

On 11 January 2019, he was loaned to Reggina.

On 18 August 2020, he joined Virtus Verona on loan. He made his professional debut on 25 August 2019 against Calcio Padova.

On 18 August 2020, he signed with Südtirol.

Honours
Empoli
 Serie B: 2017–18

References

External links
 
 

1999 births
Living people
Footballers from Naples
Italian footballers
Association football defenders
Serie B players
Serie C players
A.C. Milan players
Empoli F.C. players
Reggina 1914 players
Virtus Verona players
F.C. Südtirol players
Italy youth international footballers